The Edgar A. Burnett House is a historic house in Lincoln, Nebraska. It was built in 1904 for Edgar A. Burnett, who served as the chancellor of the University of Nebraska-Lincoln from 1899 to 1938. It was designed in the American Foursquare style by Fiske and Dieman. It has been listed on the National Register of Historic Places since July 12, 2006.

References

National Register of Historic Places in Lincoln, Nebraska
American Foursquare architecture
Houses completed in 1904
1904 establishments in Nebraska
University of Nebraska–Lincoln